is a railway station on the Saikyō Line in Kita, Tokyo, Japan, operated by the East Japan Railway Company (JR East).

Lines
Some trains continue northward to  via the Kawagoe Line and southward to  via the TWR Rinkai Line. The station is located 7.0 km north of Ikebukuro Station. The station identification colour is "lilac".

Station layout
The station consists of one elevated island platform serving two tracks. The tracks of the Tōhoku Shinkansen also run adjacent to this station, on the west side.

Platforms

History
Kita-Akabane Station opened on 30 September 1985.

Passenger statistics
In fiscal 2011, the station was used by an average of 17,295 passengers daily (boarding passengers only).

The passenger figures for previous years are as shown below.

Surrounding area
 Arakawa River
 Tokyo Mizube Line
 Ukima Library
 Tokyo-Kita Social Insurance Hospital

See also
 List of railway stations in Japan

References

External links

 Kita-Akabane Station information (JR East) 

Railway stations in Japan opened in 1985
Railway stations in Tokyo